The 1993 Ohio State Buckeyes football team represented  Ohio State University in the 1993 NCAA Division I-A football season. The Buckeyes compiled a 10–1–1 record and were co-champions of the Big Ten Conference along with the Wisconsin Badgers (who received the Rose Bowl berth) including the 1993 Holiday Bowl in San Diego, where they won 28–21 against the Brigham Young Cougars.

Schedule

Game summaries

Rice

The 1993 Ohio State Buckeyes opened the season against the Rice Owls of the Southwest Conference by wearing 25th anniversary tribute uniforms for the 1968 team that won the NCAA Division I National Championship.  These tribute uniforms would remain the home uniform throughout the season.  The Buckeyes scored all 34 of their points before Rice added a touchdown late in the game.  Redshirt sophomore quarterback Bobby Hoying completed 13 passes for 144 yards and a score, junior wide receiver Joey Galloway had three catches for 92 yards and a touchdown, while senior running back Raymont Harris added 76 yards and a score on the ground.  Sophomore linebacker Lorenzo Styles lead the defense with nine tackles while Tim Patillo recorded an interception that was returned 17 yards.

Washington

The second-ever night game at Ohio Stadium featured a visit from the defending three-peat Pac-10 champions, who were also coming off three straight Rose Bowl appearances as well.  Raymont Harris and Butler By'not'e combined for 202 yards and 2 scores on the ground, the latter's which sealed the game for Ohio State in the fourth quarter.

Pittsburgh
In the first of a four-game series between the Buckeyes and Panthers, Butler By'not'e took the opening kickoff 89 yards for a touchdown and Ohio State never looked back, scoring 35 points before Pitt got on the board.  The Panthers were able to score four second half touchdowns through the air, but 11 different Buckeye rushers combined for 307 yards on the ground and five scores while Joey Galloway hauled in two touchdown passes to secure a 63-28 victory on the road.

Northwestern

Beginning the 1993 Big Ten slate, Ohio State (30:54) and Northwestern (29:06) nearly had the same time of possession, but the Buckeyes dominated the upstart Wildcats defensively with 5 interceptions returned for 158 yards and 428 yards from the offensive side of the ball, 119 of which came through the air into Joey Galloway's hands.  Kicker Tim Williams also set personal bests for field goals (43) and consecutive extra-points kicked (64).

Illinois
Head Coach John Cooper earned his first victory over Illinois since taking over in 1988 as the Buckeye defense kept the Fighting Illini out of the endzone.  The offense put up 230 total yards, led by Raymont Harris' 90 on the ground and Cedric Saunders' 31 through the air.

Michigan State

Purdue
Ohio State jumped out to a 35-0 lead highlighted by Marlon Kerner's 100-yard interception return for a touchdown as three different running backs scored touchdowns and defensive lineman Matt Finkes recovered a fumble in the endzone for another score.

Penn State

1993 was Penn State's first year playing football in the Big Ten Conference and this was their first conference matchup with Ohio State.

Wisconsin

Ohio State jumped out to a 1st quarter 7-0 lead with a Raymont Harris TD run, then Wisconsin added touchdowns in the 2nd and 3rd quarters to go up 14-7.  Ohio State tied it up in the 4th quarter after a 26-yard Powers-to-Galloway TD pass.  With 0:07 left on the clock, Rick Schnetzky attempted a 22 yard field goal for the Badgers that was blocked by Marlon Kerner.  The game ended in a 14-14 tie, which is the most recent tied game for Ohio State.

Indiana

Michigan

1993 Holiday Bowl

Rankings

Roster

1994 NFL draftees

References

Ohio State
Ohio State Buckeyes football seasons
Big Ten Conference football champion seasons
Holiday Bowl champion seasons
Ohio State Buckeyes football